Paralabrax clathratus, the kelp bass, bull bass or calico bass, is a species of marine ray-finned fish, a sea bass from the subfamily Serraninae, classified as part of the family Serranidae which includes the groupers and anthias. It is found in the eastern North Pacific Ocean where it is an important species for both recreational and commercial fisheries.

Description
Paralabrax clathratus has an elongate, relatively deep, compressed body with a pointed snout and a large mouth. The mouth extends back as far as the centre line of the pupil and the lower mandible protrudes to form part of the snout. There are teeth all over the roof of the mouth. The margins of the preopercle have fine serrations. There is a large spine on the edge of the gill cover. The dorsal fin has 10 spines and 13-14 soft rays, the 3rd and 4th spine are the longest, both being nearly twice the height of the 2nd spine. The anal fin has 3 spines and 7 soft rays. The caudal fin is truncated, although the margin can be wavy. The juvenile fish are light brown in colour, while the adults are brown to olive-green fading ventrally The dorsal part of the head has a mottling of light yellow spots while the dorsal part of the body is patterned with black, white, and/or olive green blotches. Along the back there are rows of white, rectangle shaped spots. The males have an orange tint on their lower jaw and chin. A distinguishing feature of this species from other sea bass is that the kelp bass has piebald or multicoloured spotting under the belly, which is why it is alternatively called calico bass.

Distribution
Paralabrax clathratus is found in the eastern North Pacific Ocean off the western coast of North America. Its range extends from the central California south to the southern tip of Baja California. It was formerly found as far north as the mouth of the Columbia River on the boundary between Oregon and Washington State but it is now rare anywhere north of Point Conception in California.

Habitat and biology
They show a strong association with kelp and are almost always found inhabiting kelp forests. The fish use a variety of micro-habitats within this habitat for feeding, shelter and breeding, for example the juveniles will hide among the blades of kelp and among other seaweed species in the intertidal zone while the adults prefer deeper water, into rocky habitats where their larger size gives them some protection against predation. The kelp bass spawns in the late spring to the early autumn When spawning the adults form aggregations of up to 200 fish, but more commonly numbering around 50 individuals. The mating fish break off into smaller groups, a gravid female will swim to the substrate and males will perform courtship displays and rubbing himself against her flanks and nibbling at her fins. While they are mating, the females change colour to dark grey or black on the upper body, and bright white on their underparts, while males also darkens to an overall charcoal colour, broken by black vertical bars and white spots. The males and females release the sperm and eggs at the same time, normally around sunset. After spawning the eggs hatch within 36 hours, There is then a pelagic larval phase which lasts for at least a month before the fish settle. They maximum recorded life span is 34 years.

This species is largely diurnal and they are typically associated with some sort of cover while shade appears to be important in allowing them to effectively observe prey and to catch it. The younger fish are less site faithful than the older individuals and will move greater distances and this may be because their diet changes as they mature. The juveniles are more diurnal as zooplankton are more abundant during the day and their small size means they are subjected to greater predation so they take sanctuary among the kelp during. Sub-adults are more active at night and have a more diverse diet with their preferred prey being more active at night. As adults, kelp bass are fish eaters and are crepuscular feeder. They are normally solitary, will form aggregations in pelagic waters or spawning and to hunt as a group on bait fish. The main prey of juveniles are plankton and small benthic invertebrates, juveniles feed on small crustaceans, brittle stars and small fishes while the adults feed on larger fishes, cephalopods and larger crustaceans. All ages will feed on zooplankton if it is abundant.

Taxonomy
Paralabrax clathratus was first formally described in 1854 as Labrax clathratus by the French ichthyologist and herpetologist Charles Frédéric Girard (1822-1895) with the type locality given as San Diego, California. The generic name Paralabrax is a compound of the Greek para meaning "the side of" and labrax, meaning a fish such as the European sea bass (Dicentrarchus labrax), the specific name is Latin and means "latticed", a reference to the patterning of this species.

Utilisation
Paralabrax clathratus is considered excellent eating and there is an important commercial fishery in Mexico. The species is also an important quarry species for recreational anglers and in California no commercial fishery exists. Here the species is exploited only by recreational fisheries and the species is one of the most sought after game fishes, renowned for its fighting. In the years after the Second World War it was subjected to heavy pressure from sports fisheries and the fishery began to deteriorate until, in the 1950s, size limits and a ban on the sale of this species were introduced and the fishery recovered.

References

External links
 

clathratus
Fish described in 1854
Taxa named by Charles Frédéric Girard